The 2016–17 Buffalo Sabres season was the 47th season for the National Hockey League franchise that was established on May 22, 1970. Buffalo missed the playoffs for the sixth consecutive season.

Off-season

The Sabres held their annual development camp during the second weekend of July. After the previous two seasons in which the Sabres held the tournament in the First Niagara Center, this edition was held at HarborCenter.

The Sabres reprised their hosting of a prospect tournament for 2016, after the success of the first event in 2015. The New Jersey Devils and Boston Bruins returned for the tournament, which ran September 16–19, partially opposite the 2016 World Cup of Hockey; in contrast to the previous season, the Sabres lost both prospect tournament games and finished in third place. The Sabres contributed three players to the World Cup: Jack Eichel for Team North America, Ryan O'Reilly for Canada, and Rasmus Ristolainen for Finland.

On July 16, 2016, the Sabres hired Tom Ward as an assistant coach. Ward had spent the previous 18 seasons as the head coach for the Minnesota High School boys prep team.

The Sabres also announced that the naming rights to their home arena will change. Due to First Niagara Financial Group, the arena's previous rights holder, being subsumed into KeyBank, the team's arena was renamed KeyBank Center for the 2016–17 season. The arena naming rights have passed through a succession of regional banks, having been known as First Niagara Center, HSBC Arena and Marine Midland Arena, through its 20-year history.

Standings

Schedule and results

Pre-season

Regular season

Player stats 
As of April 9, 2017

Skaters

Goaltenders

†Denotes player spent time with another team before joining the Sabres. Stats reflect time with the Sabres only.
‡Denotes player was traded mid-season. Stats reflect time with the Sabres only.
Bold/italics denotes franchise record.

Transactions
The Sabres have been involved in the following transactions during the 2016–17 season:

Trades

Notes

Free agents acquired

Free agents lost

Claimed via waivers

Lost via waivers

Lost via retirement

Players released

Player signings

Draft picks

Below are the Buffalo Sabres' selections at the 2016 NHL Entry Draft, held on June 24–25, 2016 at the First Niagara Center in Buffalo, New York.

Notes
  The Vancouver Canucks' second-round pick went to the Buffalo Sabres as the result of a trade on June 25, 2016 that sent Mark Pysyk, a second-round pick and St. Louis' third-round pick both in 2016 (38th and 89th overall) to Florida in exchange for Dmitry Kulikov and this pick.
Florida previously acquired this pick as the result of a trade on May 25, 2016 that sent Erik Gudbranson and the Islanders fifth-round pick in 2016 to Vancouver in exchange for Jared McCann, a fourth-round pick in 2016 and this pick.
 The Buffalo Sabres' second-round pick went to the Florida Panthers as the result of a trade on June 25, 2016 that sent Dmitri Kulikov and Vancouver's second-round pick in 2016 (33rd overall) to Buffalo in exchange for Mark Pysyk, St. Louis' third-round pick in 2016 (89th overall) and this pick.
  The Dallas Stars' third-round pick went to the Buffalo Sabres as the result of a trade on February 11, 2015 that sent Jhonas Enroth to Dallas in exchange for Anders Lindback and this pick (being conditional at the time of the trade). The condition – Buffalo will receive a third-round pick in 2016 if Enroth wins fewer than four playoff games for the Stars in 2015 – was converted on April 6, 2015 when the Stars were eliminated from playoff contention.
  The Montreal Canadiens' fifth-round pick will go to the Buffalo Sabres as the result of a trade on March 2, 2015 that sent Brian Flynn to Montreal in exchange for this pick.
  The Montreal Canadiens' seventh-round pick went to the Buffalo Sabres as the result of a trade on March 2, 2015 that sent Torrey Mitchell to Montreal in exchange for Jack Nevins and this pick.

References

Buffalo Sabres seasons
Buffalo Sabres
Buffalo
Buffalo